Leave The Capital is a 2017 book written by the English rock drummer and writer Paul Hanley on the history of recording in Manchester. It was published by Route Publishing in November 2017. Hanley was the drummer in The Fall from 1980 to 1985. He currently plays with Brix & The Extricated.

Content
The book puts forward the argument that Manchester's unique musical heritage is directly traceable to the 1960s beat-boomers who started their own studios, namely Graham Gouldman and Eric Stewart of The Mindbenders; Keith Hopwood and Derek Leckenby of Herman's Hermits. It discusses many of these artists' finest songs (including the songs Gouldman wrote for Herman's Hermits and The Hollies), as well as seminal works recorded in their respective studios, by the likes of 10cc, Brian and Michael, Buzzcocks, The Clash, Joy Division, The Smiths and The Fall themselves.

Reception
Hanley's book has been warmly received. Musician and broadcaster Mike Sweeney called it "One of the best books on rock'n'roll I’ve ever read.", and Record Collector noted Hanley's "passion, flair and an attention to factual detail worthy of the BBC's John Motson." Simon McEwan of Q magazine concluded that the book made "a convincing – and thoroughly entertaining – case".

References

Sources
Hanley, Paul. Leave The Capital: A History of Manchester Music in 13 Recordings. London: Route, 2017.

External links
 Paul Hanley in Conversation at Library Lounge, Central library
 Playlist to accompany the book

2017 non-fiction books 
 Music in Manchester  
 Culture in Manchester